Goonderoo Reserve is a 593–hectare nature reserve in the Brigalow belt of Queensland, Australia.  It is located 40 km south of Emerald, 300 km west of Rockhampton and 835 km north-west of Brisbane.  It is owned and managed by Bush Heritage Australia (BHA), by which it was purchased in 1998.

History
The Brigalow belt of Queensland is subject to extensive land-clearing.  Goonderoo was on the market and likely to be cleared for agriculture.  Its purchase by BHA reflected the need to conserve representative examples of Brigalow belt ecosystems.

Flora and fauna
The reserve contains semi-arid, tropical, open forests, woodlands and savanna.  The commonest tree species is brigalow, but there are several other vegetation associations.  Bird species of conservation significance include the squatter pigeon, Australian bustard, barking owl and speckled warbler.  Mammals recorded include the koala and northern brown bandicoot.  The habitat would be suitable for establishing a colony of the endangered bridled nailtail wallaby.  Bilbies used to occur on the property.

References

External links
 Bush Heritage Australia

Bush Heritage Australia reserves
Nature reserves in Queensland
1998 establishments in Australia